Anisotenes is a genus of moths belonging to the subfamily Tortricinae of the family Tortricidae.

Species

Anisotenes acrodasys Diakonoff, 1952
Anisotenes amphiloga Diakonoff, 1952
Anisotenes axigera (Diakonoff, 1941)
Anisotenes basalis (Diakonoff, 1941)
Anisotenes bathygrapha Diakonoff, 1952
Anisotenes cacotechna Diakonoff, 1952
Anisotenes decora Diakonoff, 1952
Anisotenes dracontodonta Diakonoff, 1952
Anisotenes ellipegrapha Diakonoff, 1952
Anisotenes fallax Diakonoff, 1952
Anisotenes leucophthalma Diakonoff, 1952
Anisotenes libidinosa Diakonoff, 1952
Anisotenes oxygrapta Diakonoff, 1952
Anisotenes phanerogonia Diakonoff, 1952
Anisotenes pyrra Diakonoff, 1952
Anisotenes schizolitha Diakonoff, 1952
Anisotenes scoliographa Diakonoff, 1952
Anisotenes spodotes Diakonoff, 1952
Anisotenes stemmatostola Diakonoff, 1952
Anisotenes uniformis (Diakonoff, 1941)

See also
List of Tortricidae genera

References

 Brown, J. W. (2005). World Catalogue of Insects. 5 Tortricidae.
 Diakonoff (1952). Verhandelingen der Koninklijke Nederlandse Akademie van Wetenschappen. (2) 49 (1): 100.

External links
Tortricid.net

Anisotenes
Tortricidae genera
Taxa named by Alexey Diakonoff